Unbekannt, which is the German word for unknown, may refer to:

Films:
 Absender unbekannt, 1950 
 "Code: unbekannt", a.k.a. Code Unknown, 2000